Henrique de Souza Trevisan (born 20 January 1997) is a Brazilian professional footballer who plays as a centre back for J1 League club FC Tokyo.

Club career
Trevisan joined the youth academy of Figueirense in 2012. Trevisan made his professional debut with Figueirense in a 2-0 Campeonato Brasileiro Série A loss to Sport Recife on 11 December 2016. On 26 August 2020, Trevisan signed with Famalicão in the Portuguese Primeira Liga. On 17 February 2021, he signed with a Japanese professional football club Oita Trinita in J1 League.

In January 2022, he signed for FC Tokyo.

Career statistics

Honours

Club

Figueirense
Campeonato Catarinense (1) : 2018

References

External links
 

Profile at FC Tokyo

1997 births
Living people
People from Umuarama
Brazilian footballers
F.C. Famalicão players
Associação Atlética Ponte Preta players
Figueirense FC players
Oita Trinita players
FC Tokyo players
Primeira Liga players
Campeonato Brasileiro Série A players
Campeonato Brasileiro Série B players
Campeonato Paranaense players
J1 League players
Association football defenders
Brazilian expatriate footballers
Expatriate footballers in Portugal
Sportspeople from Paraná (state)